Robert Rankin Blackwood (20 August 1934 – 25 June 1997) was a Scottish footballer, who played as a wing half in the English Football League and the Scottish Football League

Career
Born in Edinburgh, Blackwood began his career in Scottish non-league football for junior clubs including Milton House Amateurs, Merchiston Thistle and Kelty Rangers. He then made the move to the Scottish Football League to play for Hearts. He made 136 league appearances scoring 37 goals and was part of the successful team that won the Scottish First Division twice and the Scottish League Cup.

He moved to English football in 1962 to play for Suffolk side Ipswich Town, who paid a transfer fee of £12,000.  Three years at Town produced 12 goals in 62 appearances. He moved the short distance to Colchester United in 1965, making 105 league appearances. His Football League career ended in 1968, and Blackwood moved back to Scotland to play for Hawick Royal Albert. Blackwood died on 25 June 1997 aged 62.

Honours

Club
Heart of Midlothian
 Scottish First Division Winner (2): 1957–58, 1959–60
 Scottish First Division Runner-up (3): 1953–54, 1956–57, 1958–59
 Scottish League Cup Winner (1): 1958–59
 Scottish League Cup Runner-up (1): 1960–61

References

Sources
 
 Bobby Blackwood at Colchester United Archive Database

1934 births
1997 deaths
Scottish footballers
Footballers from Edinburgh
Heart of Midlothian F.C. players
Colchester United F.C. players
Ipswich Town F.C. players
English Football League players
Association football wing halves
Scottish Football League players
Scottish Football League representative players
Hawick Royal Albert F.C. players